VIP Dance was the first season of the reality show Strictly Come Dancing in Bulgaria. It launched on 8 September 2009 on Nova Television. The show was a co-production between Nova Television and Old School Productions.

VIP Dance airs on Mondays, Tuesdays and Fridays (eliminations) at 20:00. It had been announced that the season finale was on 30 November.

Format 
The show was aired under the license of Endemol. It has been broadcast in a number of other countries, including Australia, Brazil, Chile, France, Portugal, South Africa, Spain, and Turkey.

Similarities with dancing stars 
Its first season was produced by Old School Productions in 2008, when it beat Nova Television's Big Brother 4 in ratings. Apart from the producers, Dancing Stars 1s jury members Neshka Robeva and Galena Velikova were also part of VIP Dance.

Many of the participants in bTV's show were competing in VIP Dance:
 Orlin Pavlov (jury member)
 Yana Akimova (Orlin and Yana were the winners of Dancing Stars 1)
 Rangel Spirov
 Svetlin Dimitrov
 Atanas Mesechkov
 Elena Dobrikova
 Petya Dimitrova

VIP Dance was competing with bTV's Dancing Stars 2, which launches on 1 October 2009 and produced by Slavi Trifonov.

Presenters
The main presenters of VIP Dance were Ivan and Andrey. They became popular in bTV, where they hosted the talk show Sblasak and the three seasons of Music Idol (they were also producers of the second and the third ones).

Judges
There were four members of the jury - Neshka Robeva, Galena Velikova, Orlin Pavlov and Ivaylo Manolov. Orlin was a participant in Dancing Stars 1.

Teams
 Raina (pop-folk singer), Fahradin Fahradinov (actor), Sashka Dimitrova and Svetlin Dimitrov (winner)'
 Maria Silvester (model, TV presenter), Bobby turbo (actor), Kremena Todorova and Raul Torres
 Elitsa Todorova (folk singer), Simona Peicheva (gymnast) and Krum (pop and folk-pop singer), Ana Doncheva and Alfredo Torres
 Tereza Marinova (athlete), Yordan Yovchev (gymnast), Ralitsa Merdjanova and Dimitar Bozhilov - Mako
 Anelia Ralenkova (gymnast), Nikolay Sotirov (actor), Aneta Avakyan and Atanas Mesechkov
 Kristina Mileva (model), Dejan Donkov (actor), Margarita Budinova and Rangel Spirov
 Nikoleta Lozanova (model), Nayden Naydenov (TV presenter, a participant in Big Brother 1), Elena Dobrinkova and Kostadin Kostadinov
 Mira Dobreva (TV presenter), Georgi Enchev-Goosh, Milen Tsvetkov (TV presenter), Lili Velichkova
 Daniela Iankova (TV presenter), Kamen Vodenitcharov (actor), Milen Dankov and Yana Akimova
 Iva Sofianska (TV presenter), Atanas Mihailov (TV presenter, actor), Trendafil Sarmov and Elitsa Pavlikenova
 Dilyana Popova (model), Borislav Sapundzhiev - Bobbi-Ursula (barber-stylist), Petya Dimitrova and Dean Stefanov
 Saska Vaseva (pop-folk singer), Marian Stankov - Mon Dio (journalist), Dimitrina Ruseva and Lachezar Todorov

External links
 The official website of VIP Dance

Ballroom dance
Dance competition television shows
2009 Bulgarian television series debuts
2009 Bulgarian television series endings
Nova (Bulgarian TV channel) original programming